İpək may refer to:
Birinci İpək, Azerbaijan
İkinci İpək, Azerbaijan

See also
Ipek (disambiguation)